Robert Edmonds may refer to:

 Rob Edmonds (born 1962), Australian gymnast
 Robert Bradford Edmonds (died 2007), Canadian diplomat
 Lu Edmonds (Robert David Edmonds, born 1957), English rock and folk musician

See also
 Robert Edmunds (disambiguation)